Kyle Terrel Hines (born September 2, 1986) is an American professional basketball player for Olimpia Milano of the Italian Lega Basket Serie A (LBA) and the EuroLeague. He plays at the power forward and center positions.

Hines played college basketball with the UNC Greensboro Spartans of the University of North Carolina at Greensboro.  With Olympiacos Piraeus, he won two EuroLeague championships (2012 and 2013), before winning another two with CSKA Moscow (2016 and 2019). Hines also won the EuroLeague Best Defender award twice, in 2016 and 2018. In addition, he was named to the EuroLeague 2010–20 All-Decade Team.

High school career
Hines attended ninth grade at Camden Catholic High School, where he scraped his way onto the freshman team and transferred to Timber Creek Regional High School to play for the Chargers as a sophomore, playing on its basketball team from 2001 to 2004. Timber Creek first opened its doors after Hines' freshman year ended, but after his relocation to the new school, he became a three-year varsity starter under head coach Gary Saunders. After averaging 15.3 points per game his sophomore season, Kyle burst onto the scene during his junior campaign. He was voted a First Team All-South Jersey player, after averaging 20.6 points, named MVP of the Philly USA All-Star Classic, and received a Top-20 All-Star status at Five Star Camp.

Hines repeated as a First Team All-South Jersey selection in his senior year of high school, and additionally garnered a Second Team All-State. He averaged 23.5 points per game, and eventually became his high school's all-time leading scorer, finishing his career with 1,562 total points scored (his brother Tyler, coincidentally, is also a 1,000-point career scorer at Timber Creek). Other accolades received during his senior season include: NJ Hoops First-Team All-Camden County, NJ Hoops Awards Rebounder Team, Best Post Player Team, Second-Team Top Dunkers, Best Rebounder and Top 20 All-Star at the summer Five Star Camp, and also rated one of the Top 15 seniors in the Delaware Valley.

College career

Despite a highly successful high school basketball career, Hines did not get many college scholarship offers, however the University of North Carolina Greensboro's Spartans head coach Fran McCaffery, recruited the undersized Hines.

Freshman season (2004–2005)
Hines started all 30 games and posted 13.6 points per game, a team-leading 8.6 rebounds per game, and shot a Southern Conference-leading 62.1 shooting from percentage the field (which also ranked seventh nationally). The first two games of Hines' collegiate career were double-doubles, a precedent never done before at UNCG. Blocking shots became his specialty, as evidenced by the school record 106 blocks that he amassed. This was also good for a 3.5 blocks per game average (ranking fourth nationally). In a game against Georgia Southern on February 8, 2005, he set a Fleming Gymnasium record when he grabbed 18 rebounds. Hines was selected the Southern Conference's Player of the Month for January, as well as the SoCon Freshman of the Year. At the season's conclusion, he was selected to the All-Conference Team (a remarkable feat for a freshman).

By the end of his first season, Hines had established several school records. His 259 rebounds and 175 field goals set new UNCG freshman records. The rebound total shattered the previous high of 152 and just 25 shy of the all-time record, and his field goal total was good for third all-time. He scored 408 points, which fell five short of the freshman record set by Jay Joseph.

Sophomore season (2005–2006)
The 2005–06 season began with a "new" head coach at the helm, Mike Dement (it was his second tenure with UNCG after having previously coached the Spartans from 1991 to 1995). Former head coach McCaffery left to run the Siena men's basketball program. Despite the coaching change, Hines continued to excel.

Starting 30 of UNCG's 31 games (did not play the season-opener against UW-Green Bay), Hines led the team in scoring (19.3 points per game / 578 total), rebounding (8.2 rebounds per game – also led conference / 247 total) and blocks (2.8 blocks per game / 84 total). His scoring average and point total were the most in the Spartans' Division I-era history, and most ever by a sophomore. Hines dropped in 239 field goals, also a school DI record. Showing his versatility, he ranked in the SoCon's Top 10 in steals (51; seventh) and minutes per game (34.0; fifth).

Hines recorded a school record 12 double-doubles during the 2005–06 campaign. His most impressive single-game performance came on December 31 against the #1 team in the nation, Duke, when he scored 20 points and grabbed five rebounds in the loss. Hines drew praise from legendary Duke Blue Devils head coach Mike Krzyzewski for his performance, who praised the player for good games.

On December 3, Hines set a school sophomore record when he pulled down 21 rebounds against the College of Charleston. For his excellent individual season, Hines was named to the USBWA All-District Team and All-Southern Conference First Team.

Hines credits student manager April Albritton with giving him the confidence to take his game to the next level.

Junior season (2006–2007)
After finishing as the runner-up for the Southern Conference Player of the Year award in his first two seasons, Hines finally won the award during his junior year campaign. Additionally, he became the first player in UNCG history to win the award.

In the 2006–07 season, Hines was one of only five players in all of men's college basketball to average 20+ points and 9+ rebounds per game. On November 11, 2006, he set a career-high of 38 points against Marshall, in an 82–80 overtime loss. His 605 total points scored set a new UNCG junior season record (second all-time). Another solid performance came against Duke, four days later. Despite constant double-teaming by 6'10" tall Josh McRoberts and 7'1" tall Brian Zoubek, Hines managed to score 17 points and snatch 8 rebounds, both team-highs.

At the conclusion of the season, Hines had recorded at least one blocked shot in 83 out of his 89 career games played. His school record streak of 37 consecutive games with a block, started on February 19, 2005, was ended during an early season game against Penn State, on November 13, 2006.

Senior season (2007–2008)
In his senior college season, Hines averaged 19.2 points per game, and a career-high 9.1 rebounds per game.

College statistics

|-
| style="text-align:left;"| 2004–05
| style="text-align:left;" rowspan=4| UNC Greensboro
| 30 || 30 || 33.3 || .621 || .000 || .537 || 8.6 || .8 || 1.3 || 3.5 || 13.6
|-
| style="text-align:left;"| 2005–06
| 30 || 30 || 34.0 || .622 || .182 || .551 || 8.2 || 1.9 || 1.7 || 2.8 || 19.3
|-
| style="text-align:left;"| 2006–07
| 29 || 28 || 32.0 || .555 || .167 || .600 || 9.0 || .9 || 1.4 || 2.2 || 20.9
|-
| style="text-align:left;"| 2007–08
| 31 || 30 || 32.3 || .556 || .125 || .628 || 9.1 || 1.4 || 1.8 || 3.1 || 19.2
|- class="sortbottom"
| style="text-align:left;"| Career
| style="text-align:left;"| 
| 120 || 118 || 32.9 || .584 || .153 || .586 || 8.7 || 1.2 || 1.5 || 2.9 || 18.2

Professional career

Veroli Basket (2008–2010)
After not being selected in the 2008 NBA draft, Hines signed with Veroli Basket in Italy, where he played two seasons in the Italian second division, LegaDue Basket. With Veroli, he won 2 Italian Second Division Cups, in 2009 and 2010, and he was named the MVP of the Italian Second Division Cup in 2009.

Brose Bamberg (2010–2011)
In August 2010, Hines signed a one-year contract with the German Bundesliga club Brose Bamberg. With Bamberg, he won the German Supercup and German Cup titles, and the German League championship, and he was named the Bundesliga Finals MVP in 2011. He was also named the MVP of the BBL All-Star Game that same season.

Olympiacos (2011–2013)

In July 2011, Hines signed with Olympiacos Piraeus of the Greek Basket League. With Olympiacos, he won the EuroLeague championship at both the 2012 EuroLeague Final Four and the 2013 EuroLeague Final Four, and the Greek League championship in 2012. He contributed substantially to his team in all competitions, with both scoring and defensive skills. He made notable appearances at the top level of the European game, considering his rather low height for a center-forward. On June 24, 2013, Hines opted out of his contract with Olympiacos.

CSKA Moscow (2013–2020)

On June 28, 2013, Hines signed two-year deal with the Russian powerhouse CSKA Moscow. In the 2014–15 season, CSKA Moscow managed to advance to the EuroLeague Final Four for the fourth straight season, after eliminating Panathinaikos Athens for the second straight season in their EuroLeague quarterfinal series, with a 3–1 series win.

However, in their EuroLeague semifinals game, despite being dubbed by the media as an absolute favorite to advance, CSKA once again lost to Olympiacos Piraeus. The final score was 70–68, after a great Olympiacos comeback in the 4th quarter, which was led by Vassilis Spanoulis. CSKA Moscow eventually won the EuroLeague third place game, after defeating Fenerbahçe, by a score of 86–80. In his second EuroLeague season with CSKA Moscow, Hines averaged EuroLeague career-lows up until that point, of 6.8 points and 4.3 rebounds per game, over 30 games played. CSKA Moscow finished the season by winning the VTB United League, after eliminating Khimki Moscow region with a 3–0 series sweep in the league's finals series.

On June 17, 2015, Hines signed a two-year contract extension with CSKA Moscow. With CSKA Moscow, Hines won the EuroLeague championship at the 2016 EuroLeague Final Four. In the summer of 2017, Hines competed in The Basketball Tournament on ESPN, for the number one seeded FCM Untouchables. While competing for the $2 million grand prize, he averaged 10.7 points, 11.0 rebounds, and 3.7 assists per game. Hines, whose 11.0 rebounds per game ranked second among all competing players, was one of only two players to average a double-double throughout the tournament. The Untouchables advanced to the Super 16 Round, where they were defeated by a score of 85–71 by Team FOE, a Philadelphia based team that was coached by the NBA brothers duo Markieff and Marcus Morris. Hines finished the game with 12 points and a game-high 10 rebounds.

On June 16, 2017, Hines signed a new two-year contract with CSKA Moscow. In May 2018, he was named the EuroLeague Best Defender for the 2017–18 season. Hines also won the EuroLeague championship with CSKA Moscow, at the 2019 EuroLeague Final Four.

Olimpia Milano (2020–present) 
In May 2020, Hines signed a two-year contract with the Italian League club Olimpia Milano, after spending the previous 7 seasons with the Russian VTB United League club CSKA Moscow.

Career statistics

EuroLeague statistics

|-
| style="text-align:left;"| 2010–11
| style="text-align:left;"| Brose
| 10 || 0 || 23.6 || .643 || .000 || .467 || 5.4 || .5 || .8 || 1.1 || 12.9 || 12.5
|-
| style="text-align:left;background:#AFE6BA;"| 2011–12†
| style="text-align:left;" rowspan=2| Olympiacos
| 22 || 1 || 19.6 || .519 || .000 || .576 || 4.5 || 1.0 || .4 || 1.1 || 9.9 || 9.7
|-
| style="text-align:left;background:#AFE6BA;"| 2012–13†
| 31 || 0 || 20.2 || .599 || .000 || .587 || 6.0 || 1.2 || .7 || 1.2 || 9.4 || 12.7
|-
| style="text-align:left;"| 2013–14
| style="text-align:left;" rowspan=7|CSKA Moscow
| 29 || 12 || 19.7 || .632 || .000 || .684 || 4.5 || 1.1 || .9 || .8 || 7.6 || 11.5
|-
| style="text-align:left;"| 2014–15
| 30 || 0 || 17.5 || .612 || .000 || .682 || 4.3 || .5 || .6 || .8 || 6.8 || 9.4
|-
| style="text-align:left;background:#AFE6BA;"| 2015–16†
| 29 || 16 || 26.3 || .674 || .000 || .658 || 4.7 || 1.0 || .6 || .8 || 10.9 || 13.6
|-
| style="text-align:left;"| 2016–17
| 35 || 23 || 20.3 || .650 || .000 || .702 || 4.3 || .6 || .7 || .5 || 8.5 || 10.1
|-
| style="text-align:left;"| 2017–18
| 31 || 26 || 21.8 || .605 || .000 || .787 || 4.4 || 1.2 || 1.1 || .8 || 8.4 || 12.1
|-
| style="text-align:left;background:#AFE6BA;"| 2018–19†
| 36 || 5 || 19.5 || .580 || .000 || .631 || 3.6 || 1.4 || .7 || .7 || 7.3 || 8.4
|-
| style="text-align:left;"| 2019–20
| 28 || 27 || 23.4 || .630 || .333 || .649 || 4.9 || 1.4 || .6 || .9 || 8.8 || 11.4
|- class="sortbottom"
| style="text-align:left;"| Career
| style="text-align:left;"|
| 281 || 110 || 21.0 || .613 || .125 || .649 || 4.6 || 1.0 || .7 || .8 || 8.7 || 11.0

Personal life
Born in Sicklerville, New Jersey, to Deidre Ledgister and Reggie Hines, Kyle spent his childhood growing up in South Jersey, outside of Philadelphia. Hines' father, Reggie, was a part of several different NFL training camps. He also has two younger siblings, one brother and one sister. His brother, Tyler, is also a professional basketball player. Kyle and his wife, Gianna Smith, married in July 2015.

Awards and accomplishments

College career
Hines graduated as the most decorated basketball player, men's or women's, in UNC Greensboro's school history. He is statistically one of the greatest men's basketball players in Southern Conference history, and was a good enough college basketball player to be included on an exclusive short list of NCAA Division I annals. Below are the awards garnered and records established by Hines, during his college career as a Spartan.

Note: All records and awards were at the time of his college graduation, in May 2008. Since then, some of the records may have been broken.
(Compiled from the following sources:)

Awards

Southern Conference Rookie of the Year (2005)

Southern Conference Player of the Week  (twice):
January 23, 2007
February 25, 2008

Southern Conference Player of the Month (four times):
January 2005
January 2006
December 2006
January 2007

Named Dick Vitale's "Diaper Dandy of the Week", at one point during freshman season (2005)

USBWA All-District Selection three consecutive times (2006–2008)

One of only four Southern Conference players ever to garner 4 All-Conference selections

Southern Conference Player of the Year (2007)
Other three seasons he finished as the runner-up POY
First UNCG player to ever win this award

First UNCG player to be named an All-American (2007)

Named to three Mid-Major All-American squads (2007):
CNN SI
CollegeInsider.com
CollegeHoops.net

Featured in the October issue of Basketball Times Magazine, as one of five "Under the Radar" players nationally (2007)

According to Midmajority.com, he ranked 10th in the nation (out of 1,837 qualifying players) in player efficiency (an NBA stat that is similar to that of a quarterback's passer rating in football, taking into account all of a player's positive stats, versus missed shots and turnovers) (2007)

First UNCG player to have his/her jersey number retired while still active (#42) (2008)

Career highs

43 minutes played versus East Tennessee State (OT), on January 18, 2005

38 points scored at Marshall University (OT), on November 11, 2006

21 rebounds grabbed versus College of Charleston, on December 3, 2005

6 assists versus Montreat College, on January 11, 2006

5 steals, in six games

7 blocks, in four games

Records

First UNCG player to start career with back-to-back double-doubles (2005)

Tied UNCG single game blocked shots (7) (four times)

UNCG single game rebounds (21) (2005)

Fleming Gymnasium rebounds record (18) (2005)

UNCG freshman season rebounds (259) (2005)

UNCG freshman field goals made (175) (2005)

UNCG sophomore single season points (578) (2006)

UNCG junior single season points (605) (2007)

UNCG senior single season points (596) (2008)

UNCG single season double-doubles (12) (2006)

UNCG single season 30+ point games (5) (2007)

UNCG single season free throw makes

UNCG single season free throw attempts (Div-I era) (230) (2007)

First player in school history to record back to back 500-point seasons (2006–2007)
First player to then achieve it three straight times (2006–2008)

First UNCG duo (along with Ricky Hickman) to both score 500 points in a single season (2007)

First player in school history to record three straight 400-point seasons (2005–2007)
First player to then achieve it four straight times (2005–2008)

UNCG consecutive games with at least one block (37) (2005–2006)

UNCG all-time leading scorer (2,187)

UNCG all-time leading rebounder (1,047)

Only UNCG player to join the 2000 / 1000 club

NCAA DI – one of only six players to ever record 2,000 points, 1,000 rebounds, and 300 blocks in a career:
1. Alonzo Mourning
2. David Robinson
3. Tim Duncan
4. Pervis Ellison
5. Derrick Coleman
6. Kyle Hines

Southern Conference all-time leading shot blocker (349)

Southern Conference single season blocked shots (106) (2005)

Southern Conference leader in blocks for four consecutive seasons (2005–2008)

Southern Conference consecutive double-digit scoring games (81) (2005–2008)
It was the longest such streak in the nation at his career's end

Professional career
 2× Italian Second Division Cup Winner: (2009, 2010)
 Italian Second Division Cup MVP: (2009)
 German Supercup Winner: (2010)
 German League All-Star Game MVP: (2011)
 German Cup Winner: (2011)
 German League Champion: (2011)
 German League Finals MVP: (2011)
 4× EuroLeague Champion: (2012, 2013, 2016, 2019)
 Greek League Champion: (2012)
 6× VTB League Champion: (2014–2019)
 3× EuroLeague Best Defender: (2016, 2018, 2022)
 VTB United League Defensive Player of the Year: (2016)
 EuroLeague 2010–20 All-Decade Team: (2020)

See also
 List of NCAA Division I men's basketball players with 2,000 points and 1,000 rebounds

References

External links

 Kyle Hines at EuroLeague
 Kyle Hines at RealGM.com
 Kyle Hines at Basketball-Reference.com
 Kyle Hines at Lega Basket 
 Kyle Hines at Greek Basket League 
 
 Kyle Hines at DraftExpress.com
 

1986 births
Living people
American expatriate basketball people in Germany
American expatriate basketball people in Greece
American expatriate basketball people in Italy
American expatriate basketball people in Russia
American men's basketball players
Basketball players from New Jersey
Brose Bamberg players
Centers (basketball)
Olimpia Milano players
Olympiacos B.C. players
PBC CSKA Moscow players
People from Gloucester Township, New Jersey
People from Winslow Township, New Jersey
Power forwards (basketball)
Sportspeople from Camden County, New Jersey
UNC Greensboro Spartans men's basketball players
Veroli Basket players